Papi Khaldar may refer to:

Papi Khaldar-e Olya
Papi Khaldar-e Sofla